Catarama is a town in the Los Ríos Province of Ecuador. It is the seat of the Urdaneta Canton.

Sources 
World-Gazetteer.com

Populated places in Los Ríos Province